Hans Forrer (8 April 1929 – 31 August 2017) was a Swiss alpine skier. He competed in the men's downhill at the 1956 Winter Olympics.

References

External links
 

1929 births
2017 deaths
Swiss male alpine skiers
Olympic alpine skiers of Switzerland
Alpine skiers at the 1956 Winter Olympics
Sportspeople from the canton of St. Gallen